Bala Bala Sese is a Ugandan film directed by Lukyamuzi Bashir based upon a screenplay by Usama Mukwaya, starring Michael Kasaija, Natasha Sinayobye, Raymond Rushabiro, Ismael Ssesanga, Fiona Birungi, Ashraf Ssemwogerere and Ddungu Jabal. It's the director's, writer's and producers' debut feature film.

Plot 
A boyfriend's battle for love through perseverance. In the outskirts of Sese Island, John (Michael Kasaija) is madly in love with Maggie and both are willing to take their love forward. Facing abuses and harassment by malicious Maggie’s father Kasirivu (Raymond Rushabiro), John, helped by his young brother Alex (Ssesanga Ismael) is determined to take in all but to retain the love of his life especially when he finds out that he has a contender village tycoon (Jabal Dungu) who is also lining up for Maggie (Natasha Sinayobye).

Cast 

 Michael Kasaija as John
 Natasha Sinayobye as Maggie
 Raymond Rushabiro as Kasiriivu
 Ashraf Ssemwogerere as Ireene
 Fiona Birungi as Elena
 Ismael Ssesanga as Alex
 Ddungu Jabal as Zeus
 Allen Musumba as Nanziri

Production

Filming
Principal photography on Bala Bala Sese began late 2012 and wrapped 2014. The movie was filmed on the Ssese Islands in Uganda, from which it takes its name.

Release
The film was released on 3 July 2015 at theatre Labonita. Bala Bala Sese is rather the very first Ugandan project to receive a professional marketing approach and one of the top local productions of that year and the following year. It was nominated in the 12th Africa Movie Academy Awards for Best Film in an African Language. It held its African premiere at the Luxor African Film Festival in Egypt and competed in the long Narrative category among 13 other African films. It was the opening film at the 10 Amakula International Film Festival and automatically qualified for the Golden Impala Award in the best African film which was won by De Noir.

Music and soundtrack
The soundtrack album for Bala Bala Sese was composed  by Nessim (music producer) with the official theme song Wuuyo recorded by A Pass and Nessim again of Badi Musik. The song became the singer's most successful single to date. The official video of the song premiered on 20 March 2015 at Club Guvnor and features clips from the movie.

Awards

Nominated
 2016: Long Narrative, Luxor African Film Festival
 2016: Golden Impala Award, Amakula International Film Festival
 2016: Best Film in an African Language, 12th Africa Movie Academy Awards
 2016: Helsinki African Film Festival Jury Award for Human Rights and Social Commentary.
 2016: Best Feature Film, Africa International Film Festival.

The motion picture has also been named as one of the best films of 2015 and 2016 by various ongoing critics.

 4th – Anicee Gohar, Scoop Empire
 4th – Elizabeth Mcsheffrey, British Airways, Highlife
 1st – Douglas Sebamala, Monitor Uganda

References

External links 
 
 

Ugandan drama films
Films shot in Uganda
2015 films
Films produced by Usama Mukwaya
Films with screenplays by Usama Mukwaya